Switzerland is not a member state of the European Union (EU). It is associated with the Union through a series of bilateral treaties in which Switzerland has adopted various provisions of European Union law in order to participate in the Union's single market, without joining as a member state. All but one (the microstate Liechtenstein) of Switzerland's neighbouring countries are EU member states.

Comparison 
{| class="wikitable"
! style="width:10%;" |
! style="width:45%;" |
! style="width:45%;" |
|-
|Population
|447,206,135
| (2019 estimate)
|-
|Area
|
|41,285 km2 (15,940 sq mi)
|-
|Population Density
|115/km2 (300/sq mi)
|207/km2 (536.1/sq mi) 
|-
|Capital
|Brussels (de facto)
|None , Bern 
|-
|Global cities
|Paris, Amsterdam, Milan, Frankfurt, Madrid, Brussels, Warsaw, Stockholm, Vienna, Dublin, Luxembourg, Munich, Lisbon, Prague
|Zürich
|-
|Government|Supranational parliamentary democracy based on the European treaties
|Federal semi-direct democracy under a multi-party assembly-independent directorial republic
|-
|First Leader|High Authority President Jean Monnet
|Jonas Furrer 
|-
|Current Leader|Charles Michel  Ursula von der Leyen   Roberta Metsola 
|Ignazio Cassis Alain Berset  Walter Thurnherr 
|-
|Official languages|24 official languages, of which 3 considered "procedural" (English, French and German)
|German, French, Italian, Romansh
|-
|Main Religions|72% Christianity (48% Roman Catholicism, 12% Protestantism, 8% Eastern Orthodoxy, 4% Other Christianity), 23% non-Religious, 3% Other, 2% Islam
|65.5% Christianity (35.8% Roman Catholic, 23.8% Swiss Reformed, 5.9% Other Christian), 26.3% No religion, 5.3% Islam, 1.6% Others, 1.3% Unknown
|-
|Ethnic groups|Germans (ca. 83 million), French (ca. 67 million), Italians (ca. 60 million), Spanish (ca. 47 million), Poles (ca. 46 million), Romanians (ca. 16 million), Dutch (ca. 13 million), Greeks (ca. 11 million), Portuguese (ca. 11 million), and others
|
|-
|GDP (nominal)|$16.477 trillion, $31,801 per capita
|$584 billion, $67,557 per capita
|}

Trade
The European Union is Switzerland's largest trading partner, and Switzerland is the EU's fourth largest trading partner, after the United Kingdom, U.S. and China. Export of goods from Switzerland accounts for 5.2% of the EU's imports; mainly chemicals, medicinal products, machinery, instruments and time pieces. In terms of services, the EU's exports to Switzerland amounted to €67.0 billion in 2008 while imports from Switzerland stood at €47.2 billion.

Treaties

Switzerland signed a free-trade agreement with the then European Economic Community in 1972, which entered into force in 1973.

Switzerland is a member of the European Free Trade Association (EFTA), and took part in negotiating the European Economic Area (EEA) agreement with the European Union. It signed the agreement on 2 May 1992, and submitted an application for accession to the EU on 20 May 1992. However, after a Swiss referendum held on 6 December 1992 rejected EEA membership by 50.3% to 49.7%, the Swiss government decided to suspend negotiations for EU membership until further notice. These did not resume and in 2016, Switzerland formally withdrew its application for EU membership.

In 1994, Switzerland and the EU started negotiations about a special relationship outside the EEA. Switzerland wanted to safeguard the economic integration with the EU that the EEA treaty would have permitted, while purging the relationship of the points of contention that had led to the people rejecting the referendum. Swiss politicians stressed the bilateral nature of these negotiations, where negotiations were conducted between two equal partners and not between 16, 26, 28 or 29, as is the case for EU treaty negotiations.

These negotiations resulted in a total of ten treaties, negotiated in two phases, the sum of which makes a large share of EU law applicable to Switzerland. The treaties are:

Bilateral I agreements (signed 1999, in effect 1 June 2002)
 Free movement of people
 Air traffic
 Road traffic
 Agricultural products
 Technical trade barriers
 Public procurement
 Science

Bilateral II agreements (signed 2004, in effect gradually between 2005 and 2009)
 Security and asylum and Schengen membership
 Cooperation in fraud pursuits
 Final stipulations in open questions about agriculture, environment, media, education, care of the elderly, statistics and services. This strand established the Common Veterinary Area. 

The Bilateral I agreements are expressed to be mutually dependent. If any one of them is denounced or not renewed, they all cease to apply. According to the preamble of the EU decision ratifying the agreements:

This is referred to as the "guillotine clause". While the bilateral approach theoretically safeguards the right to refuse the application of new EU rules to Switzerland, in practice the scope to do so is limited by the clause. The agreement on the European Economic Area contains a similar clause.

Before 2014, the bilateral approach, as it is called in Switzerland, was consistently supported by the Swiss people in referendums. It allows the Swiss to keep a sense of sovereignty, due to arrangements when changes in EU law will only apply after the EU–Swiss Joint Committee' decides so in consensus. It also limits the EU influence to the ten areas, where the EEA includes more areas, with more exceptions than the EEA has.

From the perspective of the EU, the treaties contain largely the same content as the EEA treaties, making Switzerland a virtual member of the EEA. Most EU law applies universally throughout the EU, the EEA and Switzerland, providing most of the conditions of the free movement of people, goods, services and capital that apply to the member states. Switzerland pays into the EU budget. Switzerland has extended the bilateral treaties to new EU member states; each extension required the approval of Swiss voters in a referendum.

In a referendum on 5 June 2005, Swiss voters agreed, by a 55% majority, to join the Schengen Area. This came into effect on 12 December 2008.

In 2009, the Swiss voted to extend the free movement of people to Bulgaria and Romania by 59.6% in favour to 40.4% against. While the EU Directive 2004/38/EC on the right to move and reside freely does not apply to Switzerland, the Swiss-EU bilateral agreement on the free movement of people contains the same rights both for Swiss and EEA nationals, and their family members.

By 2010, Switzerland had amassed around 210 trade treaties with the EU. Following the institutional changes in the EU–particularly regarding foreign policy and the increased role of the European Parliament–European Council President Herman Van Rompuy and Swiss President Doris Leuthard expressed a desire to "reset" EU-Swiss relations with an easier and cleaner way of applying EU law in Switzerland. In December 2012, the Council of the European Union declared that there will be no further treaties on single market issues unless Switzerland and EU agree on a new legal framework similar to the EEA that, among others, would bind Switzerland more closely to the evolving EU legislation. José Manuel Barroso, the President of the European Commission, later affirmed this position. However, a second referendum on Swiss EEA membership isn't expected, and the Swiss public remains opposed to joining.

Schengen Agreement

In 2009, Switzerland became a participant in the Schengen Area with the acceptance of an association agreement by popular referendum in 2005. This means that there are no passport controls on Switzerland's borders with its neighbours though customs controls continue to apply.

2014 referendum

In a referendum in February 2014, the Swiss voters narrowly approved a proposal to limit the freedom of movement of foreign citizens to Switzerland. The European Commission said it would have to examine the implications of the result on EU–Swiss relations since literal implementation would invoke the guillotine clause.

On 22 December 2016, Switzerland and the EU concluded an agreement whereby a new Swiss law (in response to the referendum) would require Swiss employers to prioritise Swiss-based job seekers (whether Swiss nationals or non-Swiss citizens registered in Swiss job agencies) whilst continuing to observe the free movement of EU citizens into Switzerland thus allowing them to work there.

Swiss financial contributions
Since 2008, Switzerland has contributed CHF 1.3 billion towards various projects designed to reduce the economic and social disparities in an enlarged EU. One example of how this money is used is Legionowo railway station, Poland, which was redeveloped with CHF 9.6 million from the Swiss budget.

Proposed framework accord
Negotiations between Switzerland and the European Commission on an institutional framework accord began in 2014 and concluded in November 2018. On 7 December 2018, the Swiss Federal Council decided to neither accept nor decline the negotiated accord, instead opting for a public consultation. The negotiated accord would cover five areas of existing agreements between the EU and Switzerland made in 1999:

 free movement of persons
 air transport
 carriage of goods and passengers by rail and road
 trade in agricultural products
 mutual recognition of standards

Notably, the accord would facilitate EU law in these fields to be readily transposed into Swiss law, and the European Court of Justice would be the final and binding arbiter on disputes in these fields. If the accord were accepted by Switzerland, the country would be in a similar position with regard to imposition of EU law (albeit only in the above five fields) as that in the other EFTA countries which are members of the EEA. Further to matters of sovereignty, specific concerns raised in Switzerland include possible effect on state aid law on the cantonal banks, the potential for transposition of the  into Swiss law (and any resulting effect on social welfare, for example) and the possible effect on wages enjoyed in the country. Accepting the accord is considered by the Commission to be necessary to allow Swiss access to new fields of the European single market, including the electricity market and stock exchange equivalence.

By June 2019, the Swiss Federal Council found no meaningful compromise neither with the internal consulting partners, such as Swiss labour unions and business representatives, nor with the outgoing EU-commission president Jean-Claude Juncker. EU-member countries have also expressed that no further compromise on the text of the proposed framework accord with Switzerland would be possible. As a result, Brussels did not extend its stock market equivalence to the Swiss stock exchange because of this breakdown of Swiss-EU negotiations, and for a counter-measure, the Swiss Federal Council ordinance from November 2018 was implemented, limiting the future exchange of most EU-traded Swiss stocks to the SIX Swiss Exchange in Zurich.Brüssel soll warten – die Schweiz schiebt den Rahmenvertrag auf die lange Bank (in German). Neue Zürcher Zeitung. Retrieved 19 August 2019.

The negotiations on the proposed framework accord between Switzerland the EU were restarted on 23 April 2021, when Swiss Federal Councilor Guy Parmelin and EU-commission president Ursula von der Leyen met in Brussels. The meeting took place in a friendly atmosphere, but no agreement could be attained as the federal councilor insisted on excluding key issues such as protection of Swiss wages, Citizens’ Rights Directive, and state aid for cantonal banks from the agreement. The following week, Stéphanie Riso, Deputy Head of Cabinet for the EU commission, informed representatives of the 27 member countries of the progress with regard to the framework accord with Switzerland. The EU commission perceived the Swiss demands as an ultimatum, and the EU member countries expressed support for the EU-leadership in the negotiations. Foreign Minister Ignazio Cassis told reporters that the impasse was due to a different interpretation of the "free movement of people" clause in the framework accord. In September 2020, Swiss voters clearly rejected a ballot measure by the Swiss People's Party to limit the free movement of persons, and decided to favour bilateral agreements with the EU. According to internal reports by the Swiss Federal Council, failed negotiations with the EU-commission have already been taking place on 11 November 2020 when chief negotiator Livia Leu took the podium for Swiss-EU talks.

On 26 May 2021, Switzerland decided to again suspend negotiations with the EU and not sign the drafted EU-Swiss Institutional Framework Agreement. The main disagreements were about freedom of movement, the level playing field and state aid rules.

On 15 November 2021, Maroš Šefčovič, EU Vice President responsible for Swiss-EU negotiations and Brexit struck a more conciliatory tone with Swiss Foreign Minister Ignazio Cassis, when they met in Brussels. The two sides agreed to establish a structured political dialogue at ministerial level, and re-open bilateral talks in early 2022. The Swiss Foreign minister in particular insisted that Switzerland will be integrated back into the Erasmus+ and the Horizon Europe programmes. At stake are a number of agreements between Switzerland and the EU, including future access to EU's electricity market, as well as EU citizens' availability of Swiss social security benefits.

Chronology of the Swiss votes

Chronology of Swiss votes about the European Union:

 3 December 1972: free trade agreement with the European Communities is approved by 72.5% of voters
 6 December 1992: joining the European Economic Area is rejected by 50.3% of voters. This vote strongly highlighted the cultural divide between the German- and the French-speaking cantons, the Röstigraben. The only German-speaking cantons voting for the EEA were Basel-Stadt and Basel-Landschaft, which border on France and Germany.
 8 June 1997: the federal popular initiative "negotiations concerning EU membership: let the people decide!" on requiring the approval of a referendum and the Cantons to launch accession negotiations with the EU (« Négociations d'adhésion à l'UE : que le peuple décide ! ») is rejected by 74.1% of voters.
 21 May 2000: the Bilateral agreements with the EU are accepted by 67.2% of voters.
 4 March 2001: the federal popular initiative "yes to Europe!" (« Oui à l'Europe ! ») on opening accession negotiations with the EU is rejected by 76.8% of voters.
 5 June 2005: the Schengen Agreement and the Dublin Regulation are approved by 54.6% of voters.
 25 September 2005: the extension of the free movement of persons to the ten new members of the European Union is accepted by 56.0% of voters.
 26 November 2006: a cohesion contribution of one billion for the ten new member states of the European Union (Eastern Europe Cooperation Act) is approved by 53.4% of voters.
 8 February 2009: the extension of the free movement of persons to new EU members Bulgaria and Romania is approved by 59.61% of voters.
 17 May 2009: introduction of biometric passports, as required by the Schengen acquis, is approved by 50.15% of voters.
 17 June 2012: the federal popular initiative "international agreements: let the people speak!" (« Accords internationaux : la parole au peuple ! ») on requiring all international treaties to be approved in a referendum launched by the Campaign for an Independent and Neutral Switzerland is rejected by 75.3% of voters.
 9 February 2014: the federal popular initiative "against mass immigration", which would limit the free movement of people from EU member states, is accepted by 50.3% of voters.
 28 February 2016: the popular initiative "For the effective expulsion of foreign criminals", which would automatically expel from the country any foreigner who committed a crime (regardless of the severity of the crime), and therefore undermine EU freedom of movement, is rejected by 58.9% of voters.
 19 May 2019: an optional referendum on transposing the European gun control directive (an update to the Schengen acquis) into Swiss law, is approved by 63.7% of voters.
 27 September 2020: the popular initiative "For moderate immigration", which would require the government to withdraw from the 1999 Agreement on the Free Movement of Persons and prevent the conclusion of future agreements which grant the free movement of people to foreign nationals, is rejected by 61.7% of voters.
 15 May 2022: the adoption of the EU regulation on the European Border and Coast Guard, which would increase the Swiss government's contribution to the Frontex border agency, is approved by 71.5% of voters.

Among these sixteen votes, just three are against further integration or for reversing integration with the European Union (6 December 1992, 4 March 2001, and 9 February 2014); the other thirteen votes are in favour of either deepening or maintaining integration between Switzerland and the European Union.

Proposals for EU membership
Switzerland took part in negotiating the EEA agreement with the EU and signed the agreement on 2 May 1992 and submitted an application for accession to the EU on 20 May 1992. A Swiss referendum held on 6 December 1992 rejected EEA membership. As a consequence, the Swiss Government suspended negotiations for EU accession until further notice. With the ratification of the second round of bilateral treaties, the Swiss Federal Council downgraded their characterisation of a full EU membership of Switzerland from a "strategic goal" to an "option" in 2006. Membership continued to be the objective of the government and was a "long-term aim" of the Federal Council until 2016, when Switzerland's frozen application was withdrawn. The motion was passed by the Council of States and then by the Federal Council in June. In a letter dated 27 July the Federal Council informed the Presidency of the Council of the European Union that it was withdrawing its application.

Concerns about loss of neutrality and sovereignty are the key issues against membership for some citizens. A 2018 survey of public opinion in Switzerland found only 3% considered that joining the EU was a feasible option.

The popular initiative entitled "Yes to Europe!", calling for the opening of immediate negotiations for EU membership, was rejected in a 4 March 2001 referendum by 76.8% and all cantons. The Swiss Federal Council, which was in favour of EU membership, had advised the population to vote against this referendum, since the preconditions for the opening of negotiations had not been met.

During the history of EU-Swiss relations, the country has undergone several substantial changes in foreign policies, depending on the democratic outcomes of ballot measures. Specific agreements with the EU on freedom of movement for workers and areas concerning tax evasion were first addressed during the Switzerland–EU summit in May 2004 where nine bilateral agreements were signed. Romano Prodi, former President of the European Commission, said the agreements "moved Switzerland closer to Europe." Joseph Deiss of the Swiss Federal Council said, "We might not be at the very centre of Europe but we're definitely at the heart of Europe". He continued, "We're beginning a new era of relations between our two entities."

The Swiss population agreed to their country's participation in the Schengen Agreement and joined the area in December 2008.

The result of the referendum on extending the freedom of movement of people to Bulgaria and Romania, which joined the EU on 1 January 2007 caused Switzerland to breach its obligations to the EU. The Swiss government declared in September 2009 that bilateral treaties are not solutions and the membership debate has to be examined again while the left-wing Green Party and the Social Democratic Party stated that they would renew their push for EU membership for Switzerland.

In the February 2014 Swiss immigration referendum, a federal popular initiative "against mass immigration", Swiss voters narrowly approved measures limiting the freedom of movement of foreign citizens to Switzerland. The European Commission said it would have to examine the implications of the result on EU–Swiss relations. Due to the refusal of Switzerland to grant Croatia free movement of persons, the EU accepted Switzerland's access to the Erasmus+ student mobility programme only as a "partner country", as opposed to a "programme country", and the EU froze negotiations on access to the EU electricity market. On 4 March 2016, Switzerland and the EU signed a treaty that extends the agreement on the free movement of people to Croatia, which led to Switzerland's full readmission into Horizon 2020, a European funding framework for research and development. The treaty was ratified by the National Council on 26 April on the condition that a solution be found to an impasse on implementing the 2014 referendum. The treaty was passed in December 2016. This allowed Switzerland to rejoin Horizon 2020 on 1 January 2017.

A poll in December 2022 to mark 30 years since the 1992 EEA referendum indicated that 71% would vote for EEA participation if a referendum were held. Support for joining the EU was just 32%.

Foreign policy
In the field of foreign and security policy, Switzerland and the EU have no overarching agreements. But in its Security Report 2000, the Swiss Federal Council announced the importance of contributing to stability and peace beyond Switzerland's borders and of building an international community of common values. Subsequently, Switzerland started to collaborate in projects of EU's Common Foreign and Security Policy (CFSP). Switzerland has contributed staff or material to EU peace keeping and security missions in Bosnia and Herzegovina, the Democratic Republic of the Congo, Kosovo, North Macedonia and the province of Aceh, Indonesia.

Close cooperation has also been established in the area of international sanctions. As of 2006, Switzerland has adopted five EU sanctions that were instituted outside of the United Nations. Those affected the former Republic of Yugoslavia (1998), Myanmar (2000), Zimbabwe (2002), Uzbekistan (2006) and Belarus (2006).

Use of the euro in Switzerland
The currency of Switzerland is the Swiss franc. Switzerland (with Liechtenstein) is in the unusual position of being surrounded by countries that use the euro. As a result, the euro is de facto'' accepted in many places, especially near borders and in tourist regions. Swiss Federal Railways accept euros, both at ticket counters and in automatic ticket machines. Also many public phones, vending machines or ticket machines accept euro coins. Many shops and smaller businesses that accept euros take notes only, and give change in Swiss francs, usually at a less favourable exchange rate than banks. Many bank cash machines issue euros at the traded exchange rate as well as Swiss francs.

On 6 September 2011, the Swiss franc effectively became fixed against the euro: the Franc had always floated independently until its rapid currency appreciation during the eurozone debt crisis. The Swiss National Bank set an CHF/EUR peg that involved a minimum exchange rate of 1.20 francs to the euro, with no upper bound in place. The Bank committed to maintaining this exchange rate to ensure stability. The peg was abandoned on 15 January 2015, when renewed upward pressure on the Swiss franc exceeded the Bank's level of tolerance.

Diplomatic relations between Switzerland and EU member states

See also
Enlargement of the European Union 
Potential enlargement of the European Union
Enlargement of Switzerland
Liechtenstein–Switzerland relations
Foreign relations of Switzerland
German immigration to Switzerland
Italian immigration to Switzerland
Schengen Area
Borders with EU members
Austria–Switzerland border
France–Switzerland border
Germany–Switzerland border
Italy–Switzerland border

Notes

References

 
Contemplated enlargements of the European Union
Third-country relations of the European Union